The roots of verbs and most nouns in the Semitic languages are characterized as a sequence of consonants or "radicals" (hence the term consonantal root). Such abstract consonantal roots are used in the formation of actual words by adding the vowels and non-root consonants (or "transfixes") which go with a particular morphological category around the root consonants, in an appropriate way, generally following specific patterns. It is a peculiarity of Semitic linguistics that a large majority of these consonantal roots are triliterals (although there are a number of quadriliterals, and in some languages also biliterals).

Such roots are also common in other Afroasiatic languages. While Berber mostly has triconsonantal roots, Egyptian and its modern descendant, Coptic, both prefer biradical and monoradical roots.

Triconsonantal roots

A triliteral or triconsonantal root is a root containing a sequence of three consonants.

The following are some of the forms which can be derived from the triconsonantal root k-t-b כ-ת-ב ك-ت-ب (general overall meaning "to write") in Hebrew and Arabic:

They are transliterated "ḵ" and "ḇ" on this page to retain the connection with the pure consonantal root כ-ת-ב k-t-b. Also notice that in Modern Hebrew, there is no gemination.

In Hebrew grammatical terminology, the word binyan (plural  binyanim) is used to refer to a verb derived stem or overall verb derivation pattern, while the word mishqal (or mishkal) is used to refer to a noun derivation pattern, and these words have gained some use in English-language linguistic terminology.

Biliteral origin of some triliteral roots
Although most roots in Hebrew seem to be triliteral, many of them were originally biliteral, cf. the relation between:

as well as between:

The Hebrew root  - √sh-q-p "look out/through"  or "reflect" deriving from  - √q-p "bend, arch, lean towards" and similar verbs fit into the shaCCéC verb-pattern.

This verb-pattern sh-C-C is usually causative, cf.

History
According to a study of the Proto-Semitic lexicon, biconsonantal roots are more abundant for words denoting Stone Age materials, whereas materials discovered during the Neolithic are uniquely triconsonantal. This implies a change in Proto-Semitic language structure concomitant with the transition to agriculture. In particular monosyllabic biconsonantal names are associated with a pre-Natufian cultural background, more than 16,500 years ago. As we have no texts from any Semitic language older than 5,500 years ago, reconstructions of Proto-Semitic are inferred from these more recent Semitic texts.

Quadriliteral roots
A quadriliteral is a consonantal root containing a sequence of four consonants (instead of three consonants, as is more often the case). A quadriliteral form is a word derived from such a four-consonant root. For example, the abstract quadriliteral root t-r-g-m / t-r-j-m gives rise to the verb forms  tirgem in Hebrew,   tarjama in Arabic,ተረጐመ "täräggwämä" in Amharic, all meaning "he translated". In some cases, a quadriliteral root is actually a reduplication of a two-consonant sequence. So in Hebrew  digdeg means "he tickled", and in Arabic  zilzāl means "earthquake".

Generally, only a subset of the verb derivations formed from triliteral roots are allowed with quadriliteral roots. For example, in Hebrew, the Piʿel, Puʿal, and Hiṯpaʿel, and in Arabic, forms similar to the stem II and stem V forms of triliteral roots.

Another set of quadriliteral roots in modern Hebrew is the set of secondary roots. A secondary root is a root derived from a word that was derived from another root. For example, the root  m-s-p-r is secondary to the root  s-p-r.  saphar, from the root s-p-r, means "counted";  mispar, from the same root, means "number"; and  misper, from the secondary root , means "numbered".

An irregular quadriliteral verb made from a loanword is:
   – "we will sprinkle" or "we will splash", from Yiddish spritz (from German spritzen)

Quinqueliteral roots
A quinqueliteral is a consonantal root containing a sequence of five consonants. Traditionally, in Semitic languages, forms with more than four basic consonants (i.e. consonants not introduced by morphological inflection or derivation) were occasionally found in nouns, mainly in loanwords from other languages, but never in verbs. However, in modern Israeli Hebrew, syllables are allowed to begin with a sequence of two consonants (a relaxation of the situation in early Semitic, where only one consonant was allowed), which has opened the door for a very small set of loan words to manifest apparent five root-consonant forms, such as  tilgref "he telegraphed". However, -lgr- always appears as an indivisible cluster in the derivation of this verb and so the five root-consonant forms do not display any fundamentally different morphological patterns from four root-consonant forms (and the term "quinqueliteral" or "quinquiliteral" would be misleading if it implied otherwise). Only a few Hebrew quinqueliterals are recognized by the Academy of the Hebrew Language as proper, or standard; the rest are considered slang.

Other examples are:
   ( – "he synchronized"), via the English word from Greek
   ( – "he did stupid things")
   ( – "he had a flirt"), from the English or Yiddish past tense of the English word

In Amharic, there is a very small set of verbs which are conjugated as quinqueliteral roots. One example is wäšänäffärä 'rain fell with a strong wind' The conjugation of this small class of verb roots is explained by Wolf Leslau. Unlike the Hebrew examples, these roots conjugate in a manner more like regular verbs, producing no indivisible clusters.

See also 
 Apophony
 Arabic grammar
 Broken plural
 Indo-European ablaut
 Khuzdul
 K-T-B
 Modern Hebrew grammar
 Nonconcatenative morphology
 Phono-semantic matching
 Proto-Indo-European root
 Š-L-M
 Transfix

Notes

References

External links

Semitic Roots Repository
Roots in Quranic Arabic
Project Root List
Learn Hebrew Verbs
Alexis Amid Neme  and Eric Laporte (2013), Pattern-and-root inflectional morphology: the Arabic broken plural |year=
  Alexis Amid Neme  and Eric Laporte (2015), Do computer scientists deeply understand Arabic morphology? - هل يفهم المهندسون الحاسوبيّون علم الصرف فهماً عميقاً؟, available also in Arabic, Indonesian, French

 
Linguistic morphology
Semitic linguistics
Root (linguistics)